Joël Giraud (born 14 October 1959) is a French politician who briefly served as Minister of Territorial Cohesion and Relations with Local Authorities under Prime Minister Jean Castex in 2022. A member of both La République En Marche! (LREM) and the Radical Movement (MR), he previously represented the 2nd constituency of the Hautes-Alpes department in the National Assembly from 2002 to 2020 and served as Secretary of State for Rurality from 2020 until 2022.

Political career
An alumnus of the École nationale d'administration, Giraud first entered the municipal council of L'Argentière-la-Bessée in 1986. He held the mayorship of L'Argentière-la-Bessée from 1989 to 2017, as well as one of the vice presidencies of the Regional Council of Provence-Alpes-Côte d'Azur under President Michel Vauzelle from 2004 to 2014.

Elected to Parliament in Hautes-Alpes's 2nd constituency in 2002, he was reelected in 2007, 2012 and 2017. He is a former Secretary of the Economic Affairs Committee. He was a member of the Radical Party of the Left until 2017, when it was merged with the Radical Party into Radical Movement, which Giraud joined. He has also been a member of Renaissance since 2016.

Giraud was appointed to the Castex government in 2020 as Secretary of State for Rurality under Minister Jacqueline Gourault. Upon her appointment to the Constitutional Council in 2022, he succeeded her as Minister of Territorial Cohesion and Relations with Local Authorities.

Following the 2022 legislative election, Giraud stood as a candidate for the National Assembly's presidency; in an internal vote, he lost against Yaël Braun-Pivet.

Personal life
Giraud is openly gay.

See also
List of deputies from Hautes-Alpes

References

1959 births
Living people
École nationale d'administration alumni
20th-century French politicians
21st-century French politicians
People from Gap, Hautes-Alpes
Radical Party of the Left politicians
La République En Marche! politicians
Radical Movement politicians
Politicians from Provence-Alpes-Côte d'Azur
Mayors of places in Provence-Alpes-Côte d'Azur
Regional councillors of France
Deputies of the 12th National Assembly of the French Fifth Republic
Deputies of the 13th National Assembly of the French Fifth Republic
Deputies of the 14th National Assembly of the French Fifth Republic
Deputies of the 15th National Assembly of the French Fifth Republic
Deputies of the 16th National Assembly of the French Fifth Republic
French LGBT politicians
Gay politicians